The Gotha WD.27 (for Wasser Doppeldecker - "Water Biplane") was a patrol seaplane developed in Germany during World War I. It was a large, four-engine aircraft with the same general layout as the WD.22; a conventional seaplane with engines grouped in tractor-pusher pairs on the lower wings. Contemporary records show three German Navy serial numbers allocated to the type, but only one of these may have been flown.

Specifications

References

 
 

1910s German patrol aircraft
Floatplanes
WD.27
Four-engined push-pull aircraft
Biplanes
Aircraft first flown in 1918